Ozraptor (meaning "Australian thief") is a genus of possibly abelisauroid theropod dinosaur from the Middle Jurassic (Bajocian) Colalura Sandstone of Australia, known from fragmentary remains.

Discovery and naming
In 1967 a group of four twelve-year-old Scotch College schoolboys found a fossil at the Bringo Railway Cutting site near Geraldton, which they showed to professor Rex Prider of the University of Western Australia. He had a cast made that he sent to experts of the British Museum of Natural History in London who thought it likely belonged to an extinct turtle. Re-evaluation of the bone in the 1990s after being prepared out of the rock by John Albert Long and Ralph Molnar classified the fossil as the shinbone of a genus of theropods.

In 1998 Long and Molnar named and described the type (and only) species Ozraptor subotaii. The generic name is derived from "Ozzies", the nickname for Australians, and a Latin raptor, "seizer". The specific name honours a fictional character, the swift-running thief and archer "Subotai" from the movie Conan the Barbarian.

The holotype, UWA 82469, was found in the Colalura Sandstone, dating to the middle Bajocian, about 169 million years ago. It consists of the distal or lower end of a left tibia. Together with Rhoetosaurus, Ozraptor  is among the oldest known Australian dinosaurs.

Three diagnostic features were established enabling it to be upheld as a distinct species of dinosaur: the ascending process of the astragalus had a rectangular shape with a straight upper end; the astragalar facet had a vertical ridge; the medial condyle was weakly developed.

Classification
Only known from one partial leg bone, Ozraptor is difficult to classify. In 1998 the describers could not more precisely determine the classification than a Theropoda incertae sedis. In 2004 Thomas Holtz thought it was a member of the Avetheropoda. In 2005 another study, by Oliver Rauhut, suggested that it was indeed a theropod, and more specifically, a member of the Abelisauroidea based on the presence of the distinct vertical median ridge on the astragalar groove. Classified as one, Ozraptor would be the oldest known abelisauroid. However, Rauhut would later go on to conclude that none of these defining chararcterists are actually limited to the abelisaurs, and thus Ozraptor can at best be classified as Theropoda indet.

See also
 Timeline of ceratosaur research

References

Abelisaurs
Middle Jurassic dinosaurs
Dinosaurs of Australia
Mesozoic reptiles of Australia
Bajocian life
Fossil taxa described in 1998
Taxa named by Ralph Molnar